The Church of the Friars Preachers of St Laurence, Stirling, commonly called Blackfriars,  was a mendicant friary of the Dominican Order founded in the 13th century at Stirling, Scotland.

History
The Chronica Extracta and John Spottiswoode alleged that the Stirling Dominican house was founded by King Alexander II of Scotland (d. 1249). Spottiswoode was particularly specific, giving a foundation date of 1233. These dates are possible, but unconfirmed by contemporary evidence.

The Stirling Dominican friary lasted over three centuries. Robert Lindsay of Pitscottie claimed that it was destroyed by Protestants in June 1559, a claim partially confirmed in a document of 12 September 1559, which speaks of the ejection of the prior and the destruction of the house earlier in the  year.  The possessions of the friary went into the hands of Alexander Erskine of Cangnoir, though on 15 April 1567, Mary, Queen of Scots, granted the revenues of all religious houses in the burgh of Stirling to the burgh authorities. Erskine however appears to have retained possession of this friary's revenues, while it is clear that the burgh of Stirling did not gain possession until 1652.

Burials
Donnchadh, Earl of Lennox
Murdoch Stewart, Duke of Albany

See also
List of monastic houses in Scotland

References

 Cowan, Ian B. & Easson, David E., Medieval Religious Houses: Scotland With an Appendix on the Houses in the Isle of Man, Second Edition, (London, 1976)

External links
 Ronald Page & Catherine Page, Blackfriars of Stirling, Proc Soc Antiq Scot, 126 (1996), 881-898

1233 establishments in Scotland
1559 disestablishments in Scotland
Churches in Stirling (council area)
Dominican houses in Scotland
History of Stirling (council area)
Former Christian monasteries in Scotland
Buildings and structures in Stirling (city)